Terque is a municipality of Almería province, in the autonomous community of Andalusia, Spain.

Demographics

References

External links
 Terque message board

Municipalities in the Province of Almería